The short racer (Platyceps brevis), is a species of snake in the family Colubridae. The species is endemic to northeastern Africa.

Geographic range
P. brevis is found in Ethiopia, Kenya, Somalia, and Tanzania.

Subspecies
Two subspecies are recognized as being valid, including the nominotypical subspecies.
Platyceps brevis brevis 
Playceps brevis smithi 

Nota bene: A trinomial authority in parentheses indicates that the subspecies was originally described in a genus other than Platyceps.

Reproduction
P. brevis is oviparous.

Etymology
The subspecific name, smithi, is in honor of American physician Arthur Donaldson Smith.

References

Further reading
Boulenger GA (1895). "Rettili e Batraci ". In: "Esplorazione del Giuba e dei suoi affluenti compiuta dal Cap. V. Bottego durante gli anni 1892-93 sotto gli auspicii della Società Geografica Italiana, risultati zoologici ". Annali del Museo Civico di Storia Naturale di Genova, Serie 2, 15: frontispiece map + xviii + 558 pp. + Plates I-V. (Zamenis brevis, new species, pp. 13–14 + Plate III, figures 3, 3a, 3b). (title in Italian, text in English). 
Boulenger GA (1895). "An Account of the Reptiles and Batrachians collected by Dr. A. Donaldson Smith in Western Somali-land and the Galla Country". Proc. Zool. Soc. London 1895: 530-540 + Plates XXIX-XXX. (Zamenis smithi, new species, pp. 536–537 + Plate XXX, figures 2, 2a).
Schätti B, Charvet C (2003). "Systematics of Platyceps brevis (Boulenger 1895) and related East African racers (Serpentes Colubrinae)". Tropical Zoology 16: 93–111.

Reptiles described in 1895
Reptiles of Africa
Platyceps